Goliath is an American legal drama streaming television series by Amazon Studios. The show was commissioned with a straight-to-series order of eight episodes on December 1, 2015 and premiered on October 13, 2016, on Amazon Prime Video. On February 15, 2017, Amazon announced the series had been renewed for a second season and confirmed that Clyde Phillips was joining the series as showrunner. The trailer for season 2 was released on May 1, 2018. Season 2, consisting of eight episodes, was released on June 15, 2018. On December 11, 2018, the series was renewed for a third season, which premiered on October 4, 2019. On November 14, 2019, Amazon announced the series was renewed for a fourth and final season, which premiered on September 24, 2021.

Premise
Goliath follows "a down-and-out lawyer (Thornton) as he seeks redemption. His one shot depends on getting justice in a legal system where truth has become a commodity, and the scales of justice have never been more heavily weighted toward the rich and powerful."

Cast

Main
Billy Bob Thornton as Billy McBride: formerly a brilliant and personable lawyer who founded the law firm Cooperman McBride with Donald Cooperman, and with whom he built it to be a successful legal firm.  He walked out of the firm and became an alcoholic after a murder suspect he got acquitted on a technicality went on to kill an entire family. He lives in an extended-stay hotel (the Ocean Lodge Hotel) by the Santa Monica Pier. McBride is also a graduate of the University of California Berkeley School of Law and Indiana University.
 Nina Arianda as Patty Solis-Papagian: a DUI lawyer and real estate agent, who brings Rachel Kennedy's case to McBride.
 Tania Raymonde as Brittany Gold: a sex worker who cares about Billy McBride and sometimes works as his legal assistant.
 Diana Hopper as Denise McBride (recurring season 1, main seasons 2–4): Billy and Michelle's 16-year-old daughter.
 William Hurt as Donald Cooperman: McBride's partner in founding Cooperman McBride (main, season 1; recurring, seasons 3–4). Cooperman is disfigured with facial burns and functions as a recluse: he rarely if ever leaves his office, and most people at the firm have never seen him. He monitors meetings and depositions remotely by cameras. Without the staff's knowledge, he has the entire office bugged, giving him access to everything that happens. He holds a grudge against McBride.

Season 1 
 Maria Bello as Michelle McBride: Billy's ex-wife and a partner at Cooperman McBride. She is angry with McBride, but respects his legal skills and is still fond of him.
 Olivia Thirlby as Lucy Kittridge: a young associate at Cooperman McBride whom Cooperman installs on the Larson case.
 Molly Parker as Callie Senate: a senior lawyer at the firm who previously used a relationship with Cooperman to advance her career.
 Sarah Wynter as Gina Larson: the widow of Ryan Larson (who worked at Borns Tech and purportedly committed suicide by blowing himself up on a boat).
 Britain Dalton as Jason Larson: Ryan and Gina's son. He eventually becomes the plaintiff in the case.

Season 2 
 Ana de la Reguera as Marisol Silva, a city councilwoman from East Los Angeles, in the race to be the first Latina mayor of Los Angeles (Seasons 2, 3).
 Matthew Del Negro as Danny Loomis, a charismatic yet devious political operative and consiglieri to the city's power elite under the guise of being a "financial analyst".
 Morris Chestnut as Deputy District Attorney Hakeem Rashad, who was on the losing side of Billy's last criminal case and has a bitter, old grudge against him.
 Mark Duplass as Tom Wyatt, a successful Los Angeles developer who wants to give the city a distinct skyline. A prominent philanthropist, he is a major contributor to mayoral candidate Marisol Silva. (Season 2, guest Season 3)

Season 3 
 Dennis Quaid as Wade Blackwood
 Amy Brenneman as Diana Blackwood
 Beau Bridges as Roy Wheeler
 Shamier Anderson as Anton/Dario
 Graham Greene as Littlecrow
 Julia Jones as Stephanie

Season 4 
 J. K. Simmons as George Zax, a ruthless pharmaceutical company executive
 Jena Malone as Samantha Margolis, the daughter of the founder and current managing partner of Margolis-True, the law firm Billy joins to help settle a high-profile pharmaceutical lawsuit.
 Lenora Crichlow as Ava Wallace-Margolis, wife of the founder and name partner of Margolis-True.
 Brandon Scott as Robert Bettencourt, a lawyer at Margolis-True working on the pharmaceutical lawsuits; he was once engaged to Samantha.
 Geoffrey Arend as Griffin Petock, the attorney for the parties to Tom True's lawsuit: Zax Pharma, Tillinger Health and Russell Drug.
 Bruce Dern as Frank Zax, former partner of Zax Pharma who was forced out by his brother George Zax after a disagreement over a key product.
 Clara Wong as Kate Zax, daughter of Frank Zax and niece of George, she is a chemist at Zax Pharma who has concerns over the long-effects of the company's flagship product.

Recurring 
 Julie Brister as Marva Jefferson: Billy's legal assistant. (Recurring Seasons 1-2, main Seasons 3-4)

Season 1 
 Damon Gupton as Leonard Letts: Corporate counsel to Borns Tech.
 Dwight Yoakam as Wendell Corey: CEO of Borns Tech.
 Harold Perrineau as Judge Roston Keller: The presiding judge on the Larson case.
 Ever Carradine as Rachel Kennedy: Ryan's sister, and the initial plaintiff in the wrongful death case against Borns Tech.
 Kevin Weisman as Ned Berring: A former employee at Borns Tech and a key witness in the case.
 Jason Ritter as FBI Agent Farley.
 Patrick Robert Smith as  Officer Ezekiel Sanders
 Rigo Sanchez as Karl Stolz
 Julia Cho as Jade Matizu
 Juan Gabriel Pareja as Gabriel Marquez
 T.W. Leshner as Alan Rubin
 Jorge Luis Pallo as Alejandro Marquez
 Gilbert Owuor as Father Anan

Season 2 
 Lou Diamond Phillips as Oscar Suarez, who works at Chez Jay, whose son Julio is falsely accused of murder.  
 Diego Josef as Julio Suarez, the son of Oscar, who is falsely accused of murder. 
 Dominic Fumusa as Detective Keith Roman: An LAPD detective involved in the conspiracy. Roman blames Billy for getting a killer off who then went on to murder a family a few years ago.
 Paul Williams as J.T. Reginald, a former colleague of Billy's with extensive contacts, who left his legal practice following the execution of a client. (season 2, 3) 
 James Wolk as FBI Special Agent Jeff Clayton, who agrees to help Billy hunt down his prime suspect in the Marcos Pena murder.
 Alexandra Billings as Judge Martha Wallace, the judge in the Pena murder case, and a former prosecutor who has history with both Billy and J.T.
 Manuel Garcia-Rulfo as Gabriel Ortega, a powerful drug lord behind the murder conspiracy; he has childhood connections to Marisol.
 David Cross as Pete "The Broker" Oakland, a real estate agent who helps Tom Wyatt with some dirty business (Recurring Season 2, Guest Season 3)
 Annika Marks as Mary Roman.
 JC Gonzalez as DJ Diego Spiz.
Zachary James Rukavina as Miguel
Paul Ben-Victor as Cleft Chin (Recurring Season 2, Guest Season 3)
John Savage as Mickey
Steven Bauer as Willie

Season 3

Season 4 
 Elias Koteas as Tom True, partner in Margolis-True and the father of Amanda True, a teenaged victim of opioid abuse
 Emma Kennedy as Amanda True, Tom True's daughter
 Obba Babatundé as Ivan Tillinger, owner of Tillinge Health, a party to Tom True's lawsuit
 Haley Joel Osment as Dylan Zax, the son of George Zax and an heir apparent to Zax Pharma
 Robert Patrick as Coach, Billy's father
Beth Grant as  Judge Meredith Caplan Reiss
Anna Jacoby-Heron as Casey Lukin, Patty's half-sister
Greg Grunberg as Greg Wetzel
Raymond Ma as Dr. Ming
Monica Potter as Christina Lukin (Guest Season 3, Recurring Season 4), Patty's birth mother
Lynda Kay Parker as Lynda Kay
Christina Kirk as Fern Potter

Episodes

Season 1 (2016)

Season 2 (2018)

Season 3 (2019)

Season 4 (2021)

Production

Development
On May 14, 2015, it was announced that Amazon had issued a pilot order for the series, then titled Trial, based on a script by David E. Kelley and Jonathan Shapiro. On December 1, 2015, Amazon announced that it was bypassing the pilot process with the project and was instead issuing a straight-to-series order consisting of a ten-episode first season to premiere in 2016.  The first season would ultimately come to consist of eight episodes total. On August 7, 2016, it was announced that the first season would premiere on October 13, 2016.

Casting
On June 25, 2015, it was reported that Kevin Costner was in talks to join the series in the lead role of Billy McBride. By June 30, he had exited talks. On July 23, 2015, it was confirmed that Billy Bob Thornton had been cast in the role. In August, Olivia Thirlby and Maria Bello joined the main cast. On September 14, Sarah Wynter was cast in the series regular role of Gina Larson. In November, Molly Parker and Britain Dalton joined the production as series regulars. The following March, Nina Arianda and Tania Raymonde were also announced as part of the main cast. In June, Dwight Yoakam and Harold Perrineau were cast in recurring roles. In August, the final casting announcements, of Diana Hopper and Jason Ritter in recurring roles, were made.

For the show's fourth and final season, Brandon Scott and Geoffrey Arend joined the main cast, while Obba Babatundé and Elias Koteas appear in recurring roles.

Setting
Goliath is set and filmed in Santa Monica, California. The venue Chez Jay, which Billy McBride frequents and often works out of, is a real-life bar and restaurant. Production for the fourth season moved to San Francisco.

Renewal 
On February 15, 2017, Amazon announced the series had been renewed for a second season. In that announcement, it was also confirmed that Clyde Phillips was joining the series in season two as the day-to-day showrunner. Kelley, Shapiro and Ross Fineman were set to remain in their roles as executive producers.

Reception

Critical response 
On review aggregator Rotten Tomatoes, the first season holds an approval rating of 78% based on 37 professional reviews, with an average score of 6.04/10. The site's critical consensus reads, "Compelling performances from an excellent cast—led by standout Billy Bob Thornton—propel David E. Kelley's Goliath into must-watch TV territory." On Metacritic the first season has a weighted average score of 65 out of 100, based on 29 critics, indicating "generally favorable reviews".

On Rotten Tomatoes, season two has an approval rating of 88% based on reviews from 8 critics. It was noted for showing much more division between critic and audience scores than the first season. 

On Rotten Tomatoes season three has an approval rating of 80% based on reviews from five critics, while season four has an approval rating of 100% based on reviews from five critics.

Awards and nominations

References

External links 
 

2010s American drama television series
2016 American television series debuts
2020s American drama television series
2021 American television series endings
Amazon Prime Video original programming
English-language television shows
Lesbian-related television shows
Serial drama television series
Television series by Amazon Studios
Television series created by David E. Kelley
Television shows filmed in California
Television shows set in Santa Monica, California